Mariinsk is a town in Kemerovo Oblast, Russia, where the Trans-Siberian Railway crosses the Kiya River (Ob's basin),  northeast of Kemerovo, the administrative center of the oblast. Population:    39,700 (1972).

History
It was founded in the 18th century as the village of Kiyskoye. In 1856, it was granted town status and renamed Mariinsk after Empress Maria, consort of Alexander II, one year later.

Administrative and municipal status
Within the framework of administrative divisions, Mariinsk serves as the administrative center of Mariinsky District, even though is not a part of it. As an administrative division, it is incorporated separately as Mariinsk Town Under Oblast Jurisdictionan administrative unit with a status equal to that of the districts. As a municipal division, Mariinsk Town Under Oblast Jurisdiction is incorporated within Mariinsky Municipal District as Mariinskoye Urban Settlement.

References

Notes

Sources

Cities and towns in Kemerovo Oblast